Wexford County Council is the authority responsible for local government in County Wexford, Ireland. As a county council, it is governed by the Local Government Act 2001. The council is responsible for housing and community, roads and transportation, urban planning and development, amenity and culture, and environment. The council has 34 elected members. Elections are held every five years and are by single transferable vote. The head of the council has the title of Cathaoirleach (Chairperson). The county administration is headed by a Chief Executive, Tom Enright. The county town is Wexford.

History
Wexford County Council was established in statute in 1898 by the Local Government (Ireland) Act 1898. The first meeting of the council was on 22 April 1899.

From 1899 to 1920, meetings of the county council were held in the Grand Jury room of the old Wexford Courthouse on Commercial Quay. After the old courthouse burnt down in the Irish War of Independence, a new courthouse was established on the site of the old jail in Hill Street in 1930. The county council relocated to the site in Hill Street at the same time. After the condition of the properties in Hill Street proved inadequate, the county council moved to a modern County Hall in Carricklawn in September 2011 and a modern courthouse was opened on Belvedere Road in 2018.

In 2014, the Local Government Reform Act 2014 dissolved Enniscorthy Town Council, Gorey Town Council, New Ross Town Council, and Wexford Borough Council. Wexford County Council became the local authority for their areas of jurisdiction.

Local Electoral Areas and Municipal Districts
Wexford County Council is divided into local electoral areas, defined by electoral divisions.

 These are grouped into borough and municipal districts for the purpose of local exercising of the powers of the local authority. The municipal district which contains the administrative area of the former Wexford Borough Council is referred to as a Borough District.

Councillors

2019 seats summary

Councillors by electoral area
This list reflects the order in which councillors were elected on 24 May 2019.

Notes

Co-options

References

External links

Politics of County Wexford
County councils in the Republic of Ireland